Evgeny Leonidovich Timkin (born September 3, 1990) is a Russian professional ice hockey forward who is currently playing with Salavat Yulaev Ufa in the Kontinental Hockey League (KHL).

Timkin made his professional debut with Avangard Omsk and joined Metallurg Magnitogorsk of the KHL during the 2013–2014 season.

Career statistics

Regular season and playoffs

International

Awards and honors

References

External links

1990 births
Living people
Avangard Omsk players
Florida Everblades players
Metallurg Magnitogorsk players
Mississippi RiverKings (CHL) players
People from Murmansk
Russian ice hockey right wingers
Salavat Yulaev Ufa players
SKA Saint Petersburg players
HC Vityaz players
Sportspeople from Murmansk Oblast